IEEE 802.11y-2008 is an amendment to the IEEE 802.11-2007 standard that enables data transfer equipment to operate using the 802.11a protocol on a co-primary basis in the 3650 to 3700 MHz band except when near a grandfathered satellite earth station. IEEE 802.11y is only being allowed as a licensed band. It was approved for publication by the IEEE on September 26, 2008.

Background
In June 2007 a "light licensing" scheme was introduced in 3650–3700 MHz band. Licensees pay a small fee for a nationwide, non-exclusive license. They then pay an additional nominal fee for each high powered base station that they deploy. Neither the client devices (which may be fixed or mobile), nor their operators require a license, but these devices must receive an enabling signal from a licensed base station before transmitting. All stations must be identifiable in the event they cause interference to incumbent operators in the band. Further, there is a requirement that multiple licensees' devices are given the opportunity to transmit in the same area using a "contention based protocol" when possible. If interference between licensees, or the devices that they have enabled, cannot be mediated by technical means, licensees are required to resolve the dispute between themselves.

Features
The 3650 MHz rules allow for registered stations to operate at much higher power than traditional Wi-Fi gear (Up to 20 watts equivalent isotropically radiated power).

IEEE 802.11y adds three new concepts to 802.11-2007 base Standard:

Contention based protocol (CBP) Enhancements have been made to the carrier sensing and energy detection mechanisms of 802.11 in order to meet the FCC's requirements for a contention based protocol.

Extended channel switch announcement (ECSA) provides a mechanism for an access point to notify the stations connected to it of its intention to change channels or to change channel bandwidth. This mechanism will allow for the WLAN to continuously choose the channel that is the least noisy and the least likely to cause interference. ECSA also provides for other functionalities besides dynamic channel selection based on quality & noise characteristics.

For instance, in 802.11y Amendment, the licensed operator can send ECSA commands to any stations operating under their control, registered or unregistered.  ECSA is also used in 802.11n.  In the 802.11n D2.0 implementation (which is shipping & undergoes Wi-Fi Alliance testing) 20 MHz & 40 MHz channel switching is provided for by the 11n PHY's ECSA implementation.  Note that 802.11n is specified for operation in the 2.4 GHz and 5 GHz license exempt bands but future amendments could permit 11n's PHY to operate in other bands as well.

Dependent station enablement (DSE) is the mechanism by which an operator extends and retracts permission to license exempt devices (referred to as dependent STAs in .11y) to use licensed radio spectrum. Fundamentally, this process satisfies a regulatory requirement that dictates that a dependent STAs operation is contingent upon its ability to receive periodic messages from a licensees base station, but DSE is extensible to other purposes in regards to channel management and coordination.

Some of the benefits of DSE include:

 The enabling station (aka the licensee's base station) may or may not be the access point that the dependent STA connects to. In fact, an enabling station may enable both an access point and its clients. Also, although the dependent STAs are required by regulation to receive information from the enabling station over the air, they are not required to transmit over the air to complete the DSE process. A dependent STA may connect to a nearby Access Point for a short period of time and use the internet or some other means to complete the channel permissioning process with the enabling station. This flexibility reduces the likelihood of a dependent STA causing interference while attempting to connect to a far off enabling station.
 The personal privacy and security of end users are ensured while, at the same time, licensees will have the information necessary to resolve disputes. All .11y devices transmit a unique identifier for the purpose of resolving interference. The high powered fixed stations and enabling stations transmit the location that they are operating from as their unique identifier. This location is also registered in an FCC database that will identify the licensee. The dependent STAs broadcast the location of the station that enabled it plus a unique string supplied by the enabling station. This ensures that the responsible party, the licensee, is contacted to resolve disputes. This mechanism also alleviates the problems associated with having the dependent STA broadcasting its location. Requiring all devices to have GPS or some other means of verifying their location would increase the cost and complexity of devices, and this solution may be inadequate indoors. This method also resolves fears that a mobile devices that constantly beacons its location could be used inappropriately by third parties to track a user's location.

Beyond the 3650 band
While the scope of 802.11y was limited to operation in the US 3650–3700 MHz band in the US, care was taken so that, if the light licensing concept was well received, it would not be necessary to start the 3+ year task group process in order for 802.11y devices to operate in other countries or in other frequency bands. As a result, lightly licensed 802.11 devices will be able to operate in any 5, 10, or 20 MHz channel that regulators make available by simply adding entries to the country and regulatory information tables in Annex I and J of 802.11.

Other potential bands for 802.11y include:

4.9 GHz The regulatory classes and channel sizing needed to support the US public safety allocation at 4.9 GHz were added to 802.11-2007. DSE and ECSA will allow frequency coordinators to have dynamic control over channel access.

5 GHz Regulators and equipment manufacturers continue to debate the effectiveness of dynamic frequency selection (DFS) as a mechanism to avoid incumbent users in the 5 GHz bands. For example, Canada is not currently certifying 802.11 equipment for use in the 5600–5650 MHz band that is used by certain types of weather radars. 802.11y may provide a solution that will allow WLANs access to these bands. Firstly, DSE can be used to create exclusion zones around incumbent users; Secondly, when combined with DSE, the 802.11y device identification mechanism allows devices that cause interference to be denied further access to a channel within seconds.

IMT-Advanced candidate bands (450–862, 2300–2400, 2700–2900, 3400–4200, and 4400–5000 MHz) Since 2003, the International Telecommunication Union (ITU) has been studying the potential for IMT-advanced services (aka systems beyond IMT-2000 or 4G) to use a number of frequencies between 450 and 5000 MHz for the next generation of cellular infrastructure. These systems will be capable of transmitting 100 Mb/s when mobile and 1000 Mb/s while stationary. Unfortunately, with the exception of a small amount of UHF spectrum that will become available upon the completion of the transition from analogue to digital television, these bands are occupied on a piecemeal basis by incumbent users that are not easily relocated. Extensive sharing studies have concluded that co-existence with legacy equipment over the same area is not feasible, so traditional mobile licensing approaches are not practical. Yet academic studies have shown that at any give time, even in dense urban environment, there is ample unused spectrum across the candidate bands. The problem is that usage by the primary services in these bands may change over time (as is the case with some radar systems) or vary by sub-channel based on location (as is the case in the TV bands "white spaces") 802.11y, along with the continued advances in multi-band radio technology, may provide a solution to this problem by granting channel access dynamically to users based on primary user avoidance techniques, location and time.

It is of note that the US has not been able to adopt a single position on the suitability of the 3650–3700 band for IMT-advanced, and that neither of the proposed positions seem to recognize the FCC's rules, or the standardization work that has been done to date.

Applications
 Back haul for Municipal Wi-Fi networks
 Industrial automation and controls
 Campus and enterprise networking
 Last Mile Wireless Broadband Access
 Fixed Point to point links
 Fixed point to mobile links
 Public safety and security networks
 Wireless community networks or Wireless User Groups

Regulatory & 802.11y time-line
 In 1995, NTIA (as per an OMB report) suggests the "transfer" of the 3650 MHz to 3700 MHz frequency band to "mixed use" status
 Dec 1998: FCC's "3650 Allocation" press release announces this "primary" to "mixed use" transition, Dec 17 1998 (Kennard's FCC.. see FCC 98-337)
 Jan 1999: The spectrum from 3650 to 3700 is given "mixed-use status" and becomes available for non-federal use
 Apr 2004: Original NPRM dated 04/23/2004 (FCC-04-100) from Powell's FCC.. Titled "Unlicensed Operation in the Band 3650–3700 MHz et al.". This is the proposed rules to maximize the efficient use of the 3650–3700 band and foster the introduction of new and advanced services
 Mar 2005: FCC releases R&O (from EOT) dated 03/16/2005, (FCC-05-56) which describes in detail the use of the 3650 band and is titled "Wireless Operations in the 3650–3700 MHz Band; Rules for Wireless Broadband Services in the 3650–3700 MHz Band"
 Mar 2005: 802.11's WNG requests that a CBP study group be formed (CBP-SG) to examine the opportunities afforded by FCC's 3650 MHz Report and Order and Memorandum Opinion and Order (FCC 05-56).
 Nov 2005: The PAR and Five Criteria from the CBP-SG are approved by the 802 Executive Committee creating the 802.11y Task Group.
 Jan 2007: First letter ballot received greater than 75% approval from 802.11 WG
 Jun 2007: This is the FCC's MO&O dated 06/07/2007 from OET (FCC-07-99) in which the Commission addresses the many petitions for reconsideration and other filings that resulted from FCC's 05-56 Report and Order see above.
 Jun 2007: Draft 3.0 received 94% approval from 802.11 WG
 Jul 2007: Conditional approval was obtained from the 802.11 Working Group and granted by the Executive Committee to forward .11y to sponsor ballot.
 Aug 2007: Last ex parte comment filed on proceeding 04-151 in response to FCC's NPRM and R&O describing operations in the 3650 band.  Almost 450 comments are filed. See WISPA's filing for example.
 Nov 2007: FCC begins providing the means, via FCC's Universal Licensing System, to allow non-Federal operators to purchase non-exclusive nationwide licenses to allow for licensed operations in the 3650 Band. Licensee call signs are assigned upon approval of application.
 Dec 21, 2007: IEEE/ISO Sponsor Ballot process begins for the 802.11 amendment y Standard using Draft 7 of the amendment.
 Jun 5 2008: Start of final 15-day Sponsor Ballot Recirc (#4) to seek approval of a Draft 11 after small Clause 17 edit. This draft will be forwarded to RevCom and the IEEE SA's Standards Board for approval and publication.
 Sep 26 2008: P802.11y is approved as a new standard during the IEEE-SA Standards Board's meeting that took place on this date. The final draft document for amendment y is forwarded to the IEEE's Standards Publications Department in preparation for printing.  This Standard took about 31 "participant weeks" over 2.5 years to draft and ballot 74 pages and resolve 1638 comments for this amendment to the 802.11 Base Standard.

Comparison chart

References

External links
 802.11y-2008 free download (req req'd) IEEE
 IEEE P802.11 - TASK GROUP Y - MEETING UPDATE: Status of Project IEEE 802.11y IEEE May 2007
 802.11y submissions archive: IEEE
 FCC's 3650 to 3700 MHz Home Page:
 FCC's About the 3650–3700 MHz radio service

Y